Triodanis leptocarpa, commonly called slimpod Venus' looking-glass, is a species of flowering plant in the bellflower family (Campanulaceae). It is native to the United States, where it is found primarily in the Great Plains and Midwest. Its natural habitat is in dry upland prairies and open rock outcrops. It is tolerant of disturbance and can be found in pastures and roadsides.

Triodanis leptocarpa is an herbaceous annual. It can be distinguished from other members of the genus Triodanis by its long, narrow leaves and fruits with a single locule. In addition, the fruits from cleistogamous flowers twist and arch away from the stem. It blooms from May to August.

References

Campanuloideae
Flora of the Northeastern United States
Flora of the North-Central United States
Flora of the Northwestern United States
Flora of the South-Central United States
Flora of the Southeastern United States
Flora without expected TNC conservation status